Bernard Deacon may refer to:

 Bernard Deacon (linguist), historian and linguist of Cornish
 Bernard Deacon (anthropologist) (1903–1927), social anthropologist